Chris Massey (born September 13, 1971) is a Republican member of the Mississippi Senate, representing the 1st District since 2012.

Massey was arrested in 2016 for aggravated assault with a shovel for an argument with two maintenance workers.  He was found guilty and given 6 months probation.

References

External links
 Mississippi State Senate - Chris Massey Official government website
 Project Vote Smart - Senator Chris Massey (MS) profile

1971 births
Living people
Politicians from Greenville, Mississippi
Republican Party Mississippi state senators
21st-century American politicians
People from Nesbit, Mississippi
Mississippi politicians convicted of crimes